The "Independence Monument" is a monument located in Ashgabat, Turkmenistan. The design of this building was inspired by traditional Turkmen tents and the traditional headgear worn by Turkmen girls. Elements of the building commemorate the independence date of Turkmenistan, 27 September. Within the building, there are exhibition halls where important works of art representing Turkmenistan history are displayed.  

Information 
The monument was erected by the Turkish company Polimeks in 2001, to the tenth anniversary of the Independence of Turkmenistan.

By tradition, foreign guests plant a young tree on the Alley of Honorary Guests near the Independence Monument.

Currency

References

External links

Ashgabat Photo Gallery.

Monuments and memorials in Turkmenistan
Buildings and structures in Ashgabat
Tourist attractions in Ashgabat
Buildings and structures completed in 2001